is a stable of sumo wrestlers, formerly part of the Tokitsukaze ichimon or group of stables. It was founded in 1982 by former komusubi Yutakayama, who branched off from Tokitsukaze stable. Minato-oyakata studied at the Tokyo University of Agriculture, and due to his interest in academia his stable was the first to introduce a library on its premises. Until the arrival of Ichinojō, the stable had produced just one makuuchi division wrestler, Minatofuji, who reached a highest rank of maegashira 2 in 1995 and later became a coach at the stable under the name Tatsutagawa. In July 2010 Minato and Tatsutagawa swapped roles. In the same month the Chinese wrestler Nakanokuni earned promotion to the jūryō division. In December 2017 Minato-oyakata left the Tokitsukaze ichimon, leaving the stable unaffiliated to any group. As of January 2023, it had 11 wrestlers. In September 2018 it joined the Nishonoseki ichimon.

People

Ring name conventions
Many wrestlers at this stable take ring names or shikona that include the character 湊 (read: minato), which is the first character in the stable name, and which is also in deference to their coach and the stable's owner, the former Minatofuji. It can be used as a prefix, as in Minatoryū and Minatoshō, or as a suffix, as in Hamaminato and Haruminato.

Owners
2010–present: 23rd Minato (iin, former maegashira Minatofuji)
1982-2010: 22nd Minato (former komusubi Yutakayama)

Notable active wrestlers

Ichinojō (best rank sekiwake)

Referees
Kimura Motoki (makuuchi gyōji, real name Hiromichi Okamura)

Hairdresser
Tokomori (2nd class tokoyama)

Location and access
Saitama Prefecture, Kawaguchi City, Shibanakata 2-20-10
15 minute walk from Warabi Station on Keihin Tōhoku Line

See also
List of sumo stables
List of active sumo wrestlers
List of past sumo wrestlers
Glossary of sumo terms

References

External links
Official site 
Japan Sumo Association profile

Active sumo stables